Mahadevi, also referred to as Adi Parashakti, Adi Shakti, and Abhaya Shakti, is the supreme goddess in the Shaktism sect of Hinduism. According to this tradition, all Hindu goddesses are considered to be manifestations of this single great Goddess, who is comparable to the deities Vishnu and Shiva as Para Brahman. Vaishnavas consider her to be Lakshmi, Shaivas consider her to be Parvati, Durga, and Mahakali, while Shaktas consider her to be Durga, Tripura Sundari, Bhuvaneswari, and Kali. Author Helen T. Boursier says: "In Hindu philosophy, both Lakshmi and Parvati are identified with the great goddess  Mahadevi  and the Shakti or divine power".

Vaishnavism 

The goddess Lakshmi is revered as Mahadevi in the Vaishnavite tradition, extolled to possess a thousand names and qualities. Various texts like the Garuda Purana, Bhagavata Purana, and Lakshmi Tantra refer to Lakshmi as Mahadevi.

According to Saptashati, the iconographical characteristics of Lakshmi are as follows: "She bears 18 hands carrying a rosary, axe, mace, arrow, thunderbolt, lotus, pitcher, rod, shakti, sword, shield, conch, bell, wine-cup, trident, noose, chakra, and the discus". Lakshmi is revered to be prakriti, the perfect creation: self-sustaining, self-contained Nature. She is worshipped as maya, the delightful delusion, the dream-like expression of divinity that makes life comprehensible, hence worth living. She is true shakti, energy, boundless and bountiful.

Shaivism 
The Shiva Purana says Adi Parashakti incarnated in materialistic form as Parama Prakriti from the left half of Lord Shiva i.e.Parabrahman during the beginning of the Universe. The Linga Purana states that Adi Shakti brings forth the evolution of life in every Universe through the union of every Parvati and Shiva in all of the Universes.

Shaktism 

Shaktas conceive the Goddess as the supreme, ultimate, eternal reality of all existence, or same as the Brahman concept of Hinduism. She is considered to be simultaneously the source of all creation, its embodiment and the energy that animates and governs it, and that into which everything will ultimately dissolve. She has manifested herself as Shiva in male form. Her half is Shiva.

Importance
In the Devi Gita, it is suggested that before incarnating as Parvati, she appeared to King Himalaya and revealed divine, eternal knowledge to him. She explained herself, in the words of the Vedas, as having neither beginning nor end. She is the only, eternal truth. The whole universe is her creation. She is the only victor and the manifestation of victory itself. She is a manifested, un-manifested and transcendent divinity. She then displayed her scarcely seen form to him: Satyaloka was located in her forehead; the created universe were her hairs; the sun and moon were her eyes; in her ears were the four directions; the Vedas were her words; death, affection and emotion were her teeth; maya was manifested by her smile. The goddess Parvati as Kushmanda gives birth to the universe in the form of a cosmic egg which manifests as the universe. Ultimately, Adi Shakti herself is the zero energy which exists even after destruction of the universe and before its creation.

Shakta Puranas
The Devi Bhagavata Purana described her in the form of Bhuvaneshvari. It mentioned that Shiva worshipped and meditated on Adi Parashakti for thousands of years, using the beeja mantra "Hreem". The Goddess Adi Parashakti is also considered to be both the truly supreme spirit without form (Param Atman) and Saguna with form. In her Saguna form she is described as the Mother of the Universe and is residing in Sarvaloka Manidweepa above all of the other realms. She is the Great Goddess, and all other goddesses and even all the Gods are her various forms, says the Devi Gita. In Devi Mahatmyam, Trimurti and demigods praises Adi Shakti.

Cosmogony 
In the third canto of the Srimad Devi Bhagavatam, Devi addressed the Trimurti as follows:

According to the Tripura Rahasya, Mahadevi was the only goddess existed before the beginning of the universe. She is supposed to have created the Trimurti, and began the creation of the universe.

Forms 

Mahadevi can take various forms including Kali, Durga, and Chandi.

In Vaishnavism, Lakshmi is traditionally worshipped as secondary to her consort Vishnu, and represents the bliss of a settled and domestic life. However, in Shakta traditions Lakshmi either is, or is a representation of, the supreme deity. In texts such as the Lakshmi Tantra, she is both the creator and the destroyer. In her capacity as Mahalakshmi, she is synonymous with Mahadevi.

In Shaivism, the Devi Parvati is the complete incarnation of Adi Parashakti. Parvati was Sati in her previous birth. Sati was also a direct incarnation of Adi Parashakti. However, Sati died and was reborn as Parvati. Parvati is shown as kind and loving mother goddess. 

According to Shakta traditions, Devi is the ultimate goddess and complete physical embodiments of Adi Parashakti. Brahma, Vishnu, Shiva of this Brahmanda are her subordinates and cannot function without her power. Thus, she is considered the supreme Goddess and primary deity in Shaktism as she is the nearest representative of Adi Parashakti who further incarnated as Parvati. Whatever deity one is worshiping they are, ultimately, worshiping Adi Parashakti.

According to the Srikula tradition in Shaktism, Tripura Sundari is the foremost of the Mahavidyas, the highest aspect of Mahadevi and also the primary goddess of Sri Vidya. The Tripura Upanishad places her as the ultimate Shakti (energy, power) of the universe.

Iconography 
Adi Parashakti is generally seen as an abstract goddess but her appearance is described in the Devi Bhagavata Purana, Kalika Purana, Markandeya Purana-Devi Mahatmya, Brahmanda Purana-Lalita Sahasranama, and the Tripura Rahasya. According to the Devi Bhagavata Purana, the goddess once invited the Trimurti to Manidvipa. The Trimurti saw the supreme goddess Bhuvaneshvari sitting on a jeweled seat on a throne. Her face contained the radiance of millions of stars and her celestial beauty was so great, that the Trimurti were not able to look at her. She carries the Abhaya and Varada Mudra, Pasha, and Ankusha.

Epithets 
Mahadevi is known by many names. She is commonly known as Mulaprakrti ('she who is primordial matter') and Mahamaya ('she who is the great maya'). The Devi Bhagavata Purana and Lalita Sahasranama describe Mahadevi's numerous epithets. These names include her divine and destructive characteristics. In the Devi Bhagavata Purana she is described as 'the mother of all', 'the life force in all beings', and 'she who is supreme knowledge'. The Lalita Sahasranama also describes her as Visvadhika ('she who transcends the universe'), Sarvaga ('she who is omnipresent'), Vishvadharini ('she who supports the universe'), Raksasaghni ('she who slays demons'), Bhairavi ('the terrible one'), and Sarhharini ('she who destroys'). Mahadevi's destructive features are further described in a hymn called Aryastava, calling her Kalaratri ('night of death') and Nistha ('she who is death').

Association

With incarnations of Vishnu 
The Guhyati guyha-tantra associates the Mahavidyas with the ten avatars of Vishnu, and states that the Mahavidya forms of Mahadevi are the source from which the avatars of Vishnu arose.

Lesser forms

Yogamaya 
Adi Parashakti is regarded to be the one who actually creates maya for the gods and teaches them what to do and what not to do, so that they can be connected to the ultimate God. She helps Vishnu to slay the demons Madhu and Kaitabha to save the world. Moreover, she is also the one that who takes Vishnu to mystic sleep, and hence is called the Yoganidra of Narayana. Her presence is supposed to be required by yogis, sages and bhaktas, so that they can be connected to God. Shaktas consider her to be goddess Durga.

Mahamaya 
She is the goddess that destroys the upfold of illusion. She is the one that creates and destroys maya. She is controlled by Yogamaya and hence subordinate to Yogamaya and senior to Maya. She emerges as seven mothers to destroy evil forces of Shumbha and Nishumbha, with Chamunda being one of them. She is required to gain physical strength, health, satvika attributes and demotes anger, greed and arrogance Shaktas consider her as form of Durga.

Maya 
She is the one who deludes living beings from god and takes any being to the world of illusion. She promotes greed, anger, and arrogance. It is assumed that in the Age of Kali Yuga, her effect is highest.

In popular culture 
 The Tenth Riddle, a novel by Sapan Saxena, is based on Mahadevi and her ten forms or Mahavidyas.

References

Citations

Works cited

Further reading
 
 

Lakshmi
Singular God
Hindu goddesses